Long line or longline may refer to:

Long Line, an album by Peter Wolf
Long line (topology), or Alexandroff line, a topological space
Long line (telecommunications), a transmission line in a long-distance communications network
Longline fishing, a commercial fishing technique
AT&T Long Lines, a telecommunications network
AT&T Long Lines Building, now known as 33 Thomas Street, a building in New York City
Aerial crane or longline, a transport method